A reason for the longevity of the Byzantine Empire is how they managed their foreign relations. When excluding the Roman Empire of which the Byzantine Empire is a direct continuation of, it still stands as the longest living regime to have ruled in Europe (and second in the world only to Japan). Armed combat was the primary method with the evolved traditions of the Roman Empire, however Byzantine diplomacy which eventuated with their many treaties was used extensively as well. A lot of what we know of the world (and Europe in particular) during the Middle Ages comes from the records of Byzantine scholars, which were detailing the Empire's interactions.

Byzantine and Persian-Turk relations

Göktürk relations: 6th–7th centuries

The Göktürks of the First Turkic Khaganate, which came to prominence in 552 CE, were the first Turkic state to use the name Türk politically. They played a major role with the Byzantine Empire's relationship with the Persian Sasanian Empire. The first contact is believed to be 563 and relates to the incident in 558 where the slaves of the Turks (the Pannonian Avars) ran away during their war with the Hephthalites.

The second contact occurred when Maniah, a Sogdian diplomat, convinced Istämi (known as Silziboulos in Greek writings) of the Göktürks to send an embassy directly to the Byzantine Empire's capital Constantinople, which arrived in 568 and offered silk as a gift to emperor Justin II. While the Sogdians were only interested in trade, the Turks in the embassy proposed an alliance against the Persians which Justin agreed to. The Persians had previously broken their alliance with the Turks due to the competitive threat they represented. This alliance guaranteed the arrival of west-bound silks from China and increased the risk of a war on two fronts for the Persians, with hostilities that would eventuate with the Byzantine–Sasanian War of 572–591. In 569 an embassy led by Zemarchus occurred which was well received and likely solidified their alliance for war.

Another set of embassies occurred in 575–576 led by Valentine which were received with hostility by Turxanthos due to alleged treachery. They required the members of the Byzantine delegation at the funeral of Istämi to lacerate their faces to humiliate them. The subsequent hostility shown by the new ruler Tardu would be matched in Byzantine writings. With the insults reflecting a breakdown of the alliance, the likely cause is that the anger was due to the Turks not having their expectations met from their agreements and realising they were being used when they no longer aligned with the current goals of the Byzantine Empire (who correspondingly lacked trust in the Turks as partners).

Years later, they would collaborate again when their interest aligned. The Turks attacked the Avars when they sacked a Byzantine city in the Balkans (Anchialos in 584). Toward the end of the Byzantine–Sasanian War of 602–628, the Turks allied with the Byzantine Empire and played a decisive role with the Third Perso-Turkic War.

Sasanian Persian relations: 3rd–7th centuries

The Sasanian Empire succeeded the Parthian Empire, the traditional arch-rival of the Roman Empire. They were recognized as one of the leading world powers alongside its main rival the Byzantine Empire. This was from the overthrow of  the Parthian dynasty in the 3rd century by Ardashir I until their total collapse against the Arabs. There would be many wars between the rivals during this period.

The Byzantine Empire's final war weakened the Sasanian Empire which set up its destruction by the Arabs. The climactic Byzantine–Sasanian War of 602–628, which included the siege of the Byzantine capital Constantinople, ended with both sides having drastically exhausted their human and material resources.  In 627, allied with Turks, Heraclius invaded the heartland of Persia. A civil war broke out in Persia, during which the Persians killed their king, and sued for peace. By the end of the conflict, both sides had exhausted their human and material resources and achieved very little. Consequently, they were vulnerable to the sudden emergence of the Islamic Rashidun Caliphate, whose forces invaded both empires only a few years after the war. The Muslim armies swiftly conquered the entire Sasanian Empire as well as the Byzantine territories in the Levant, the Caucasus, Egypt, and North Africa.

Seljuk relations: 11th–13th centuries

The Seljuk Turks was a Sunni Muslim dynasty from the Qiniq branch of the Oghuz Turks. They gradually became Persianate and contributed to the Turco-Persian tradition in the medieval Middle East and Central Asia. The Seljuks established both the Seljuk Empire and the Sultanate of Rum, which at their heights stretched from modern day Iran to Anatolia, and were targets of the First Crusade.

After the conquest of territories in present-day Iran by the Seljuq Empire, a large number of Oghuz Turks arrived on the Byzantine Empire's borderlands of Armenia in the late 1040s. Eager for plunder and distinction in the path of jihad, they began raiding the Byzantine provinces in Armenia. At the same time, the eastern defenses of the Byzantine Empire had been weakened by Emperor Constantine IX Monomachos, who allowed the thematic troops (provincial levies) of Iberia and Mesopotamia to relinquish their military obligations in favour of tax payments. As a consequence of this invasion, the Battle of Kapetron occurred in 1048.

Over the next century, the Byzantine and Seljuk armies would fight many battles, with the Battle of Manzikert in 1071 considered a turning point in the history of Anatolia. The legacy of this defeat would be the loss of the Byzantine Empire's Anatolian heartland. The battle itself did not directly change the balance of power between the Byzantines and the Seljuks; however the ensuing civil war within the Byzantine Empire did, to the advantage of the Seljuks.

Emperor Alexios I Komnenos sent envoys that would have a large impact on history. He was worried about the advances of the Seljuks in the aftermath of the Battle of Manzikert of 1071, who had reached as far west as Nicaea, and sent envoys to the Council of Piacenza in March 1095 to ask Pope Urban II for aid against the invading Turks. What followed was the First Crusade. The Seljuk sultans bore the brunt of the Crusades and eventually succumbed to the Mongol invasion at the 1243 Battle of Köse Dağ. For the remainder of the 13th century, the Seljuks acted as vassals of the Ilkhanate. Their power disintegrated during the second half of the 13th century. The last of the Seljuk vassal sultans of the Ilkhanate, Mesud II, was murdered in 1308.

Ottoman relations: 13th–15th centuries

The dissolution of the Seljuk state left behind many small Turkish principalities. Among them were the Ottoman dynasty, which originated from the Kayı tribe branch of the Oghuz Turks in 1299, and which eventually conquered the rest and reunited Anatolia to become the Ottoman Empire. Over the next 150 years, the Byzantine–Ottoman wars were a series of decisive conflicts between the Ottoman Turks and Byzantines that led to the final destruction of the Byzantine Empire and the dominance of the Ottoman Empire.

In 1453, the Ottoman Empire conquered Constantinople, the capital city of the Byzantine Empire. They followed by conquering its splinter states, such as the Despotate of the Morea in 1460, the Empire of Trebizond in 1461, and the Principality of Theodoro in 1475.

Byzantine and Arab relations

Rashidun Caliphate: 632–661

Umayyad Caliphate: 661–750

Abbasid Caliphate relations: 750–1453

Byzantine and Western Europe relations

Holy See relations: 7th–15th centuries
The Holy See, as we know it today, was under the formal authority of the Byzantine Empire until the 8th century. The apostolic see of Diocese of Rome was established in the 1st century. However, the legal status of the Christian Church and its property was not recognised until the Edict of Milan in 313 by Constantine the Great, and it became the state church of the Roman Empire by the Edict of Thessalonica in 380 by Emperor Theodosius I. Based in Ravenna, the Praetorian prefecture of Italy following the death of Constantine from 337 had authority over the diocese of Rome, including after the fall of the Western Roman Empire in 476 and was replaced with the Exarchate of Ravenna (and the Duchy of Rome) from 584 to 751 following the Lombard invasion in 568.

The Holy See began to exhibit independence in the 8th century and a rivalry. A crisis began in 726, called the Byzantine Iconoclasm, that had the Bishop of Rome, Pope Gregory II, formally in opposition to the emperor Leo III the Isaurian. Further, following the loss of Castle of Sutri that was part  Byzantine territory, the Pope negotiated back the lost territory with the Lombards. It would be the first time land was granted outside of Duchy of Rome and is known as the Donation of Sutri in 728 of King Liutprand of the Lombards. Sovereignty was established by the Donation of Pepin in 756 by King Pepin of the Franks, which began the Papal States. Tensions increased with the Byzantine Empire when Pope Leo III crowned Charlemagne as Roman Emperor by translatio imperii in 800, a title that had been used by the Byzantine emperor in Constantinople since the time of Constantine. The Donation of Constantine, composed probably in the 8th century, was a forged Roman imperial decree by emperor Constantine supposedly transferred authority over Rome and the western part of the Roman Empire to the Pope.

The rivalry developed into the 1054 East–West Schism. It led to the permanent split of the two churches into the modern-day Catholic Church and Eastern Orthodox Churches. The Byzantine emperors appealed to the West for help in the final years of its existence, but the Pope would only consider sending aid in return for a reunion of the Eastern Orthodox Church with the See of Rome. Church unity was considered, and occasionally accomplished by imperial decree, but the Orthodox citizenry and clergy intensely resented the authority of Rome and the Latin Rite.

Emperor Alexios I Komnenos, worried about the advances of the Seljuks in the aftermath of the Battle of Manzikert of 1071 who had reached as far west as Nicaea, sent envoys to the Council of Piacenza in March 1095 to ask Pope Urban II for aid against the invading Turks. What followed was the First Crusade.

Franks relations: 5th–9th centuries
Although the Frankish name does not appear until the 3rd century, at least some of the original Frankish tribes had long been known to the Romans under their own names, both as allies providing soldiers, and as enemies. They would eventually form into the Merovingian dynasty and Carolingian dynasty.

The Franks, in partnership with the Pope, distinguished a new Roman empire and rival power centre. The Libri Carolini published in the 790s made the first mention of the term "Empire of the Greeks" (Latin: Imperium Graecorum) and Imperator Graecorum (Emperor of the Greeks) was an insult first formally attributed to Pope John XIII. Western medieval sources thereafter beginning to refer to the Byzantine Empire as such. This was done to reestablish equal imperial dignity to the Empire of the Franks and what would later become known as the Holy Roman Empire. It would not be until the 19th century that the term "Empire of the Greeks" was replaced with the now modern term "Byzantine Empire".

Following the Treaty of Verdun in 843, the Frankish Realm was divided into three separate kingdoms: West Francia, Middle Francia and East Francia. In 870, Middle Francia was partitioned again, with most of its territory being divided among West and East Francia, which would hence form the nuclei of the future Kingdom of France and the Holy Roman Empire respectively, with West Francia (France) eventually retaining the choronym.

Republic of Venice relations: 8th–15th centuries
Venice started as a Roman city in 421 CE. Following the collapse of the Western Roman Empire and the reconquest of the Italian peninsula under Justinian I, it would come under the jurisdiction of the Byzantine Empire through the Duchy of Ventia under the Exarchate of Ravenna in 584. The changing politics of the Frankish Empire began to change the factional divisions of Venice. The pro-Frankish fraction seized power and elected Obelerio degli Antenori but he would subsequently flee and the failed siege by Pepin of Italy became a turning point for Venice. The independence of Venice was possibly confirmed by the Pax Nicephori, an agreement between Charlemagne and Nicephorus, which recognized Venice as Byzantine territory and also recognized the city's trading rights along the Adriatic coast, as Charlemagne previously ordered the Pope to expel the Venetians from the Pentapolis.

The Byzantine Empire's relationship with Venice evolved into dependence. Around 841, the Republic of Venice sent a fleet of 60 galleys (each carrying 200 men) to assist the Byzantines in driving the Arabs from Crotone, but failed. The Golden Bull of 1082 issued by Alexios I Komnenos granted Venenian merchants with tax exempt trading rights throughout the Byzantine Empire in return for their defense of the Adriatic Sea against the Normans. Subsequent extensions of these privileges and the Empire's naval impotence at the time resulted in a virtual maritime monopoly and stranglehold over the Empire by the Venetians.

Subsequent Byzantine Emperors tried to reduce Venice's influence which eventually made them enemies. John II Komnenos tried to refuse the 1082 treaty but was forced to come to terms after a retaliation. Manuel I Komnenos would go a step further and conclude agreements with Venice's rivals: Pisa, Genoa and Amalfi. Gradually, all four Italian cities were also allowed to establish their own quarters in the northern part of Constantinople itself, towards the Golden Horn. This created tensions and the subsequent imprisonment of Venetian merchants led to the Byzantine–Venetian war of 1171 that devastated the Venetian fleet. The subsequent predominance of the Italian merchants caused economic and social upheaval in the Byzantine Empire and this would lead to the 1182 Massacre of the Latins. These events are noteworthy because they created the political background to the 1204 Sack of Constantinople by the fourth crusade.

Crusader armies looted and destroyed parts of Constantinople, forever changing the Byzantine Empire. After the capture of the city, the Latin Empire (known to the Byzantines as the Frankokratia or the Latin Occupation) was established and Baldwin of Flanders was crowned Emperor Baldwin I of Constantinople in the Hagia Sophia. After the city's sacking, most of the Byzantine Empire's territories were divided up among the Crusaders. Byzantine aristocrats also established a number of small independent splinter states, one of them being the Empire of Nicaea, which would eventually recapture Constantinople in 1261 and proclaim the reinstatement of the Empire.

Following the recapture of Constantinople in 1261, Venice's privileged position deteriorated. In 1268, the Byzantine Empire and the Republic of Venice agreed to temporarily end the hostilities which had erupted after Emperor Michael VIII Palaiologos success in 1261. It would be renegotiated and extended for two years with the Byzantine–Venetian treaty of 1277. The Byzantine–Venetian War (1296–1302) was an offshoot of the second Venetian–Genoese War of 1294–1299.

Other notable events
 Nicaean–Venetian treaty of 1219
 Treaty of Gallipoli
 Byzantine civil war of 1341–1347
 Byzantine civil war of 1373–1379

Byzantine and Eastern Europe relations

Bulgarian relations: 7th–14th centuries

 Byzantine–Bulgarian wars
 Byzantine–Bulgarian treaty of 716
 Byzantine–Bulgarian treaty of 815
 Christianization of Bulgaria
 Sviatoslav's invasion of Bulgaria

Serbian relations: 7th–15th centuries

Rus relations: 9th–15th centuries

Between 850 and 1100, the empire developed a mixed relationship with the Kievan Rus', which had emerged to the north across the Black Sea. This relationship had long-lasting repercussions in the history of the East Slavs, and the empire quickly became the main trading and cultural partner for Kiev. The Rus' launched their first attack against Constantinople in 860, pillaging the suburbs of the city. In 941, they appeared on the Asian shore of the Bosphorus, but this time they were crushed, an indication of the improvements in the Byzantine military position after 907, when only diplomacy had been able to push back the invaders. Basil II could not ignore the emerging power of the Rus', and following the example of his predecessors he used religion as a means for achieving political purposes. Rus'–Byzantine relations became closer following the marriage of Anna Porphyrogeneta to Vladimir the Great in 988, and the subsequent Christianisation of the Rus'. Byzantine priests, architects, and artists were invited to work on numerous cathedrals and churches around Rus', expanding Byzantine cultural influence even further, while numerous Rus' served in the Byzantine army as mercenaries, most notably as the famous Varangian Guard.

Even after the Christianisation of the Rus', however, relations were not always friendly. The most serious conflict between the two powers was an invasion of Bulgaria in 968, but several Rus' raiding expeditions against the Byzantine cities of the Black Sea coast and Constantinople are also recorded. Although most were repulsed, they were often followed by treaties that were generally favourable to the Rus', such as the one concluded at the end of the war of 1043, during which the Rus' indicated their ambitions to compete with the Byzantines as an independent power.

Georgian relations: 11th–15th centuries

Other relations

Byzantine and Vandal relations: 3rd–7th centuries

Relations between the Byzantine Empire and the Kingdom of the Vandals were marked by periodic outbursts of hostility between the two powers. The Vandals seized Carthage and Northern Africa from the western Roman empire in 439 A.D. The attack caused the Byzantines to fear a potential Vandalic attack on Constantinople and take precautions against it. An expedition was briefly launched against them in 441, but recalled soon after due to other pressures on the state. However, the Vandals would begin launching raids against Byzantium in the middle of the century.  The first major military action against them was the disastrous expedition launched in tandem with the forces of the western empire in 469. At Cape Bon, over a 100 Roman ships were destroyed by Vandal fire ships, debatably due to the treachery or incompetence of the Roman commander, Basiliscus. This failure would eventually spell the doom of the western empire, while causing a massive drain on the resources of the Eastern empire.  The last major confrontation between the Vandals and the Byzantines would come in the Vandalic War, wherein Byzantine troops under the command of Belisarius successfully invaded North Africa and destroyed the Vandalic kingdom under Gelimer. The Vandal state was annexed into Byzantine territory.

Byzantine and Ostrogoth relations: 5th–6th centuries

Byzantine and Visigoth relations: 5th–6th centuries

Byzantine and Avar relations: 6th–9th centuries

Byzantine and Norman relations: 7th–15th centuries

See also 

 List of Byzantine wars
 List of Byzantine battles

Notes

References